Daniel Lugo (born July 30, 1945, in Caguas, Puerto Rico) is a Puerto Rican actor.

He has played several prominent parts in telenovelas such as Prisionera, La Hija del Mariachi, El Rostro de Analía, and most recently as Renato Conde in La Casa de al Lado.

Telenovelas 

2010- El Clon -Telemundo

●  1982 - La Bruja 

 1987 - Miami Vice ....Father of Ernesto Lupe
 1995 - Amores de fin de siglo ....Santiago
 1996 - Quirpa de tres mujeres ....Juan Cristóbal Landaeta 
 1998 - Reina de corazones ....Ramiro Vega 
 
 2004 -  Prisionera....Rodolfo Russián
 2006 - La hija del mariachi ....Comandante Leonardo Salas 
 2007 - Pecados ajenos ....Marcelo Mercenario
 2008 - El Rostro de Analía ....Dr. Armando Rivera 
 2010 - El clon ....Ali Rashid 
 2011 - La casa de al lado ....Renato Conde 
 2013 - Las Bandidas ....Olegario Montoya
 2020 - 100 días para enamorarnos  .... Judge Francisco Guzmán

Films 

 1978 - El enterrador de cuentos
 1979 - Dios los cría ....Carlos
 1985 - La gran fiesta
 1986 - Nicolás y los demás ....Paco
 1994 - Linda Sara ....Gustavo
 1995 - El final
 1995 - Manhattan Merengue! ....Don Cosme
 1997 - La Primera Vez ....Benedicto
 1998 - Amaneció de Golpe
 1998 - 100 años de perdón ....Valmore
 1999 - Undercurrent ....Detective Leone
 2001 - Second Honeymoon .... Antonio
 2003 - Dreaming of Julia ....Capt.Rosado
 2004 - Envy ....Italian Minister
 2005 - My Backyard Was a Mountain ....Gentleman
 2006 - Thieves and Liars ....Carmona
 2008 - Deception ....Mr. Ruiz

Theater
 2010 - Hairspray .... Wilbur Turnblad.

References

External links 
 

1945 births
Living people
People from Caguas, Puerto Rico
Puerto Rican male film actors
Puerto Rican male stage actors
Puerto Rican male telenovela actors
Puerto Rican male television actors